Qezeljeh-ye Sadat (also Romanized as Qezeljeh-ye Sādāt; also known as Qezeljeh) is a village in Alan Baraghush Rural District, Mehraban District, Sarab County, East Azerbaijan Province, Iran. At the 2006 census, its population was 245, in 53 families.

References 

Populated places in Sarab County